Mamadou N'Diaye (born January 12, 1984) is a Senegalese football (soccer) defender. He currently plays for Portimonense S.C.

External links
lpfp.pt 

1984 births
Living people
Senegalese footballers
Vitória F.C. players
Portimonense S.C. players
Primeira Liga players
Association football defenders
Place of birth missing (living people)